Sylvester "Hooks" Foreman (August 4, 1895 – August 23, 1940) was an American baseball catcher in the Negro leagues. He played from 1921 to 1933, playing with several teams.

Foreman initially made the rolls and is listed on reserve lists with the Kansas City Monarchs from 1920 to 1924, but usually played for owner J. L. Wilkinson's barnstorming team All Nations during those years, following and often catching for John Donaldson. He would continue to work with Donaldson and other top Negro league pitchers after that, playing in Bertha, Minnesota, Little Falls, Minnesota, and Moose Jaw, Saskatchewan.

Foreman is buried in Coffeyville, Kansas.

References

External links
 and Baseball-Reference Black Baseball stats and Seamheads

1895 births
1940 deaths
People from Sequoyah County, Oklahoma
All Nations players
Homestead Grays players
Indianapolis ABCs players
Milwaukee Bears players
Kansas City Monarchs players
Cleveland Browns (baseball) players
Washington Pilots players
Baseball players from Oklahoma
Burials in Kansas
20th-century African-American sportspeople
Baseball catchers